Nsubane Pongola Transfrontier Conservation Area is a proposed protected area concept, that could potentially become a joint venture between South Africa and Eswatini. The concept includes the following properties:

In South Africa:
  Phongolo Nature Reserve
  Harloo Game Ranch
  Shayamoya
  Pongolapoort Dam
  Pongola Game Reserve North
  Pongola Game Reserve South

In Eswatini::
  Mkhulameni (Government Farm)
  G Scheepers (Farm)
  W Bennett (Farm)
  Nsubane Community Area
  Tibiyo Ranches
  Siza Ranch
  F Vermaak (Farm)
  Richmond Estates
  Mr. Zikalala (Farm)

Future plans
This park, once it's proven itself will become part of the Greater Lubombo Transfrontier Conservation Area.

References

 peaceparks.org

Protected areas of South Africa
Protected areas of Eswatini